The Mache River is a river that enters the Pacific Ocean through the Cojimies Estuary on the north coast of Ecuador.

Location

The sources of the river are protected by the  Mache-Chindul Ecological Reserve, which covers the Mache Chindul mountain range.
The Mache River is one of the main tributaries of the Cojimies Estuary.
Seven rivers flow into the estuary, but their flows have been drastically reduced and only four now flow year round.
The river is deflected to the north by the Cojimíes peninsula before entering the Pacific.
The peninsula encloses a bay fringed with mangroves, with sandbars forming at its mouth.

Environment

The estuary, on the border between Esmeraldas and Manabí provinces, contains a large section of mangroves in the Manabí mangroves ecoregion.
There has been extensive excavation of shrimp ponds in the salt marshes and mangroves of the bay.
There has been a serious decline in fish such as chame (Dormitator latifrons) and cockles, important sources of food and income for the local people.
The two barrier islands at the mouth of the estuary are nesting areas for birds and turtles, and have ecotourism potential.

See also
List of rivers of Ecuador

References

Sources

Rivers of Ecuador